The Glaser Grat is a mountain of the Lepontine Alps, located between Safien and Tschappina in the canton of Graubünden. It lies just north of the Glas Pass, from where a trail leads to the summit.

References

External links

 Glaser Grat on Hikr

Mountains of the Alps
Mountains of Switzerland
Mountains of Graubünden
Lepontine Alps
Two-thousanders of Switzerland
Tschappina